In the United States, there are several distinct types of mayors, depending on the system of local government.

Types of mayoralty

Many American mayors are styled as "Their Honor" while in office.

Council-Manager
Under council–manager government, the mayor is a first among equals on the city council, analogous to a head of state for the city. They may chair the city council, lacking any special legislative powers, but in most cases able to set the legislative agenda. The mayor and city council serve part-time, with day-to-day administration in the hands of a professional city manager. The system is most common among medium-sized cities from around 25,000 to several hundred thousand, usually rural and suburban municipalities.

Mayor-Council
In the second form, known as mayor–council government, the mayoralty and city council are separate offices. Under a strong mayor system, the mayor acts as an elected executive with the city council functioning with legislative powers. They may select a chief administrative officer to oversee the different departments. This is the system used in most of the United States' large cities, primarily because mayors serve full-time and have a wide range of services that they oversee. In a weak mayor or ceremonial mayor system, the mayor has appointing power for department heads but is subject to checks by the city council, sharing both executive and legislative duties with the council. This is common for smaller cities, especially in New England (where most towns do not even have mayors at all). Charlotte, North Carolina and Minneapolis, Minnesota are two notable large cities with a ceremonial mayor.

History

Long-serving mayors of large cities are not common because  as many cities have term limits or see turnover in leadership due to elections or other factors. Political scientists, historians and journalists have covered the famously good and notoriously bad mayors in history.

Richard J. Daley of Chicago
Richard J. Daley served as mayor of Chicago for 21 years, from 1955 until his death in 1976.  He controlled the powerful Cook County Democratic machine, which generated votes and provided support in Washington and the state capital. He worked closely with the business community which flourished.

Richard M. Daley of Chicago
Richard M. Daley, the mayor's son, served 22 years, 1989 to 2011. He focused on upgrading the Chicago infrastructure and the police, and diversifying the  economy away from manufacturing toward services. He was criticized for greatly enlarging the city's debt.

Ed Koch of New York
Ed Koch served as mayor of New York City from 1978 to 1989, a total of 11 years. He was known for his tough-talking style and his success in cleaning up the city's streets and reduce crime.

Fiorello LaGuardia of New York 
Fiorello LaGuardia was a charismatic and influential mayor of New York City for 12 years (1934-1945) during the Great Depression and World War II. He was a Republican who fought against the Democratic Party of Tammany Hall with a coalition of Republicans, liberals and leftists. He worked closely with the liberal Presidency of Franklin D. Roosevelt. An effective and beloved leader, he was known for his progressive policies and his crusade against corruption.

Thomas Menino of Boston 
Thomas Menino served as mayor of Boston from 1993 to 2014, a total of 21 years. He was known for his efforts to improve public safety, expand public transportation, and revitalize the city's neighborhoods.

William Hale Thompson of Chicago
William Hale Thompson--"Big Bill" was elected mayor of Chicago for two separate  1915 to 1923 and 1927 to 1931. He opposed prohibition and tolerated gangsters like Al Capone. He was also known for his colorful and often controversial rhetoric and for his pro-business policies.

Antonio Villaraigosa of Los Angeles
Antonio Villaraigosa, a Latino leader, served as the mayor of Los Angeles, from 2005 to 2013, a total of 8 years. He emphasized upgrading public transit and airports, and battled youth gangs.

Jimmy Walker of New York
Jimmy Walker was the mayor of New York City for six years of prosperity and depression, 1926 to 1932. He was a liberal Democrat from the Tammany Hall Irish machine. Flamboyant and charismatic, he loved nightlife, jazz, and Broadway. He ridiculed Prohibition, and patronized speakeasies where liquor was served illegally.  When prosperity collapsed in 1929 his involvement in corruption and scandal was no longer tolerable. In 1932, he was forced to resign; he moved to Europe.

Kevin White of Boston
Kevin White served as mayor of Boston from 1968 to 1984, a total of 16 years. He worked to revitalize the city's downtown area and supported public schools and universities. He came under criticism for his handling of racial tensions and police brutality.

Coleman Young of Detroit
Coleman Young served as mayor of Detroit from 1974 to 1994, a total of 20 years. He was the city's first African American mayor was known for promoting racial justice and economic development.

See also
 List of mayors of the 50 largest cities in the United States
 List of longest-serving mayors in the United States

References

Further reading
 Adler, Jeffrey S. African-American mayors: Race, politics, and the American city (University of Illinois Press, 2001).
 Flanagan, Richard M. "Opportunities and constraints on mayoral behavior: A historical-institutional approach." Journal of Urban Affairs 26.1 (2004): 43-65.
 Grossman, Mark. Political corruption in America: an encyclopedia of scandals, power, and greed (Abc-Clio, 2003).
 Holli, Melvin G. ed. The American Mayor: The Best & The Worst Big-City Leaders (Penn State Press, 1999). online
 McNitt, Andrew D. "Big city mayors: political specialization and business domination in the 19th and 20th centuries." Journal of Urban Affairs 33.4 (2011): 431-449.

Local government in the United States
Mayors of places in the United States